Chaïm Nissim (21 November 1949 in Jerusalem – 11 April 2017 in Switzerland) was an ecological activist and militant, and a Green politician. He was the perpetrator of a rocket attack on the Superphénix nuclear plant, on 18 January 1982.

Biography 
Chaïm Nissim was born in Jerusalem in 1949. He was raised and studied in Israel up to the age of 14, when his father was appointed director of an Israeli bank and his family moved to Geneva, Switzerland. Nissim obtained a degree in electronical and computer engineering at the EPFL in 1973.

Activist background and attack on Superphénix 
For ten years, Nissim, believing that fast breeder reactor "can explode with their fast neutrons", did everything he could to stop the construction of the Superphénix nuclear plant, including training himself for underground guerilla, notably sabotaging electricity pylons with explosives.

On 18 January 1982, Nissim fired five rockets on the Superphénix nuclear plant, then under construction. Five rocket-propelled grenades were launched at the incomplete containment building – two hit and caused damage, missing the reactor's empty core.

The weapon, a RPG-7, was obtained from the Red Army Faction through Carlos the Jackal and the Belgian Communist Combatant Cells.

Nissim states that:

However, the plant manager disagreed with the previous statement, saying that the twenty workers on site were put in danger and that one rocket landed 20 meters away from a worker.

Nissim further stated:

Political career 
In 1985, Chaïm Nissim was elected member of the Grand Council of Geneva, under the aegis of the Green Party of Switzerland. He held the position until 2001.

On 8 May 2003, Nissim went public about the rocket attack of 1982, publishing a book on the subject and his connections to terrorist groups.

Nissim supported the association NOÉ21, a think tank on energy policies.

References 

Eco-terrorism
Swiss Jews
1949 births
2017 deaths
École Polytechnique Fédérale de Lausanne alumni
20th-century Swiss politicians
21st-century Swiss politicians